Ollier is a surname. Notable people with the surname include:

 Charles Ollier (1788–1859), publisher 
 Charly Ollier (born 1985), football player
 Claude Ollier (1922–2014), writer 
 Cliff Ollier (born 1931), geologist
 Edmund Ollier (1827–1886), journalist 
 Louis Léopold Ollier (1830–1900), surgeon
 Patrick Ollier (born 1944), politician
 Rémy Ollier (1816–1845), Mauritan activist

See also
 Ollier disease, disease of cartilage

French-language surnames